The 2001 Paris–Roubaix was the 99th running of the Paris–Roubaix single-day cycling race, often known as the Hell of the North. These are the results for the 2001 edition of the Paris–Roubaix cycling classic, in which Servais Knaven won and Domo-Farm Frites team took all positions in the podium.

Results
15-04-2001: Compiègne-Roubaix, 254.5 km

References

2001
2001 in road cycling
2001 in French sport
Paris-Rubaix
April 2001 sports events in France